Brendan Meyer (born October 2, 1994) is a Canadian actor. He is best known for his role as Adam Young in Mr. Young and Nelson Ort on the television show Dinosapien. In 2016, he appeared in the Netflix series The OA. He is also known for his portrayal of Eric/Dunbar Rakes in the web series T@gged.

Filmography

Films (theatrical and television)

Television series

Awards and nominations

References

External links

1994 births
Living people
21st-century Canadian male actors
Canadian male child actors
Canadian male film actors
Canadian male television actors